Autumn in New York is a 1950 album by Jo Stafford, re-released in 1955 with extra tracks, and again in 1997.  With Paul Weston And His Orchestra. The album was re-released in 1997 on CD along with 1953's Starring Jo Stafford on the EMI label.

1950 Version Track listing 
 "Autumn in New York" (Vernon Duke) - 2:39
 "Smoke Gets in Your Eyes" (Jerome Kern, Otto Harbach) - 2:46
 "Haunted Heart" (Arthur Schwartz, Howard Dietz) - 2:44
 "If I Loved You" (Richard Rodgers, Oscar Hammerstein II) - 2:57
 "Just One of Those Things" (Porter) - 2:40
 "Almost Like Being in Love" (Frederick Loewe, Alan Jay Lerner) - 2:57
 "Make Believe" (Kern, Hammerstein) - 2:27
 "Through the Years" (Vincent Youmans, Edward Heyman) - 2:39

1955 Version Track listing 
 "Autumn in New York" (Vernon Duke) - 2:39
 "Smoke Gets in Your Eyes" (Jerome Kern, Otto Harbach) - 2:46
 "Haunted Heart" (Arthur Schwartz, Howard Dietz) - 2:44
 "If I Loved You" (Richard Rodgers, Oscar Hammerstein II) - 2:57
 "In the Still of the Night" (Cole Porter) - 2:40
 "Some Enchanted Evening" (Rodgers, Hammerstein) - 3:12
 "Just One of Those Things" (Porter) - 2:40
 "Almost Like Being in Love" (Frederick Loewe, Alan Jay Lerner) - 2:57
 "Make Believe" (Kern, Hammerstein) - 2:27
 "Through the Years" (Vincent Youmans, Edward Heyman) - 2:39
 "The Best Things in Life Are Free" (Buddy DeSylva, Ray Henderson, Lew Brown) - 2:24
 "Sometimes I'm Happy" (Youmans, Irving Caesar) - 3:10

References

1950 albums
Jo Stafford albums
Albums arranged by Paul Weston
Capitol Records albums
Albums conducted by Paul Weston